The Romantic Novelists' Association (RNA) is the professional body that represents authors of romantic fiction in the United Kingdom. It was founded in 1960 by Denise Robins (first president), Barbara Cartland (first vice-president), Vivian Stuart (first elected chairman), and other authors including Elizabeth Goudge, Netta Muskett, Catherine Cookson, Rosamunde Pilcher and Lucilla Andrews.

The RNA has a membership approaching 1000, composed of authors and publishing professionals. It promotes and celebrates excellence in romantic fiction across all sub-genres. It offers a programme of events throughout the year including an annual conference and workshops/seminars on aspects of writing craft and the publishing industry. The organisations also supports a number of regional chapters, who meet regularly to discuss issues of concern to writers of romantic fiction. The organisation also runs the New Writers' Scheme, under which unpublished authors receive an appraisal of their work from an experienced member of the Association. Netta Muskett was co-founder and vice-president of the association and the Netta Muskett Award for new writers, now called the RNA New Writers Scheme, was created in her honour.

Many of its members are best-selling and award-winning international authors and also speakers and creative writing tutors.

Awards 

The RNA recognises excellence in romantic fiction through their annual Romantic Novel of the Year Awards. The Romantic Novel of the Year Awards cover several categories, including fantasy, contemporary and saga, and are unique in that they are judged solely by readers. Once a year, the RNA also awards a debut authors' prize sponsored by Dr David Hessayon. The RNA also holds an annual industry awards, recognising individuals and or companies who have promoted the genre of romantic fiction.

Staff

Officers 
Source.

Board of Directors

Chair

 2021 – present: Jean Fullerton

Education Officer

 2022 – present: Andrea Davies

Website Coordinator

 2022 – present: Lisa Firth

Member Services Officer

 2021 – present: Clare Flynn

Press Officer

 2022 – present: Annette Hannah

Romantic Novel of the Year Awards Organiser

 2022 – present: Sharon Ibbotson

Industry Awards Organiser

 2022 – present: Laura E. James

Events Coordinator

 2021 – present: Sue Merritt

Governance Officer

 2022 – present: Seána Talbot

Leadership Team

Other senior volunteers (part of the wider Senior Leadership Team of the RNA). 

PA to the Board / RNA Event PR

 2022 – present: Melanie Griffiths

Secretary

 2021 – present: Ali Henderson

Diversity and Inclusion Officer

 2022 – present: Liam Livings

Presidents 
 2011– present: Catherine Rose Gordon-Cumming Fforde (Katie Fforde)
 1986–2011: Diane Margaret Pearson McClelland (Diane Pearson)
 1966–1986: Ida Cook (Mary Burchell)
 1960–1966: Denise Naomi Klein Robins Pearson (Denise Chesterton, Denise Robins, Hervey Hamilton, Francesca Wright, Ashley French, Harriet Gray, Julia Kane)

Vice-Presidents 
Current Vice-Presidents
 Marina Oliver (Sally James, Donna Hunt, Bridget Thorn, Vesta Hathaway, Livvy West, Laura Hart)
 Nancy Jean Buckingham Sawyer (Nancy Buckingham, Christina Abbey, Erica Quest, Nancy John, Hilary London)
Former Vice-Presidents
 Elizabeth Margaret Stevens O'Rourke (Betty O'Rourke)
 Tilly Armstrong (Tania Langley, Kate Alexander)
 Sheila O'Nions Walsh (Sheila Walsh, Sophie Leyton)
 Hilda Pressley Nickson (Hilda Nickson, Hilda Pressley, Hilary Preston)
 Noreen Ford Dilcock (Norrey Ford, Jill Christian, Christian Walford)
 Elizabeth de Beauchamp Goudge (Elizabeth Goudge) 
 Evadne Price (Helen Zenna Smith )
 Netta Rachel Muskett (Netta Muskett, Anne Hill)
 Dame Mary Barbara Hamilton Cartland (Barbara Cartland) 
 Dorothy Delius Black MacLeish (Dorothy Black)
Honorary Vice-Presidents
 Ida Crowe Pollock (Joan M. Allen, Susan Barrie, Pamela Kent, Averil Ives, Anita Charles, Barbara Rowan, Jane Beaufort, Rose Burghley, Mary Whistler, Ida Pollock, Marguerite Bell)
Associate Vice-Presidents
 Rosemary de Courcey 
 Linda Evans 
 Sue Fletcher
 John Hale 
 Michael Legat 
 Judy Piatkus 
 Karin Stoecker 
 Jane Wood

Committee

Committee Chair 
 2021 – present: Jean Fullerton (chair)
 2019–2021: Alison May
 2017–2019: Nicola Cornick
 2015–2017: Eileen Ainsworth Ramsay (Eileen Ramsay)
 2013–2015: Pia Tapper Fenton (Christina Courtenay)
 2011–2013: Anne Ashurst, née Bushell (Sara Craven)
 2009–2011: Catherine Rose Gordon-Cumming Fforde (Katie Fforde)
 2007–2009: Catherine Jones (Kate Lace, Annie Jones)
 2005–2007: Jenny Haddon (Sophie Weston)
 2003–2005: Anthea Kenyon 
 2001–2003: Jean Chapman
 1999–2001: Norma Curtis 
 1997–1999: Angela Arney 
 1995–1997: Elizabeth Mary Oakleigh-Walker Buchan (Elizabeth Buchan)
 1993–1995: Jean Innes Saunders (Jean Saunders, Jean Innes, Rowena Summers, Sally Blake, Jodi Nicol, Rachel Moore)
 1991–1993: Marina Oliver (Sally James, Donna Hunt, Bridget Thorn, Vesta Hathaway, Livvy West, Laura Hart)
 1989–1991: Margaret Pemberton (Maggie Hudson, Carris Carlisle, Christina Harland, Rebecca Dean)
 1987–1989: Tilly Armstrong (Tania Langley, Kate Alexander)
 1985–1987: Sheila O'Nions Walsh (Sheila Walsh, Sophie Leyton)
 1983–1985: Diana Morgan 
 1981–1983: Contance Fecher Heaven (Constance Fecher, Constance Heaven, Christina Merlin)
 1979–1981: Clare Cavendish
 1977–1979: Elizabeth Fancourt Harrison (Elizabeth Harrison) 
 1975–1977: Nancy Jean Buckingham Sawyer (Nancy Buckingham, Christina Abbey, Erica Quest, Nancy John, Hilary London)
 1973–1975: Leila Antionette Sterling Mackinlay (Leila Mackinlay, Brenda Grey)
 1971–1973: Alice Mary Chetwynd Humphrey Ley (Alice Chetwynd Ley)
 1969–1971: Lois Dorothea Low (Dorothy Mackie Low, Lois Paxton, Zoë Cass)
 1967–1969: Marjorie Bell Marshall (Stella March)
 1965–1967: June Sylvia Thimblethorpe (Sylvia Thorpe)
 1963–1965: Noreen Ford Dilcock (Norrey Ford, Jill Christian, Christian Walford)
 1961–1963: Violet Vivian Finlay Stuart Mann (Vivian Stuart, Alex Stuart, Barbara Allen, Fiona Finlay, V.A. Stuart, William Stuart Long, Robyn Stuart)

Current Committee 

Hon Treasurer
 Sally Calder
Hon Deputy Treasurer
 Anna Scamans

Hon Secretary
 Julie Vince
Others
 Jean Fullerton 
 Jules Wake 
 Adrienne Vaughan
 Alison Knight
 Celia Anderson
 Gill Stewart
 Julie Stock
 Katherine Garbera 
 Anne Stenhouse

Honor Life members 
 Sarah Broadhurst 
 Edwin Buckhalter 
 David G. Hessayon (Dr. D.G. Hessayon)
 Caroline Sheldon 
 June Sylvia Thimblethorpe (Sylvia Thorpe)

References

External links 
 

British writers' organisations
1960 establishments in England